Pithecellobium dulce, commonly known as Manila tamarind, Madras thorn, monkeypod tree or camachile, is a species of flowering plant in the pea family, Fabaceae, that is native to the Pacific Coast and adjacent highlands of Mexico, Central America, and northern South America. It is also sometimes known as monkeypod, but that name is also used for several other plants, including Samanea saman. It is an introduced species and extensively naturalized in the Caribbean and Florida, as well as the Philippines and Guam via the Manila galleons. It has also been introduced to Thailand and South Asia, It is considered an invasive species in Hawaii.

Description 
Its trunk is spiny and up to nine meters in girth (9.4 feet thick DBH) and its leaves are bipinnate. The flowers produce a pod, which turns pink when ripe and opens to expose the seed arils; a pink or white, edible pulp. The pulp contains black shiny seeds that are circular and flat. Pollen is a polyad of many pollen grains stitched together. 

The seed is dispersed via birds that feed on the sweet pulp.

Vernacular names 

The English names "Manila tamarind" and "Madras thorn" are both misleading since it is neither related to the tamarind nor native to Manila (though it was introduced early to the Philippines) or Madras. Other English names include blackbead, sweet Inga, and monkeypod.

Depending on the region of its occurrence, Pithecellobium dulce is known by different names. The Nahuatl derivations are also preserved in its names in the Philippines, where it was first introduced into Asia via the Manila galleons.

In South Asia and the rest of Southeast Asia, it is known by many names, most of which literally translate to "foreign tamarind". In Pakistan, it is also known as "jungle jalebi", after the resemblance of its fruits to the jalebi.

Uses

As food 
The seed pods contain a sweet and sour pulp which is eaten raw in Mexico, the Philippines, Pakistan, Qatar and India as an accompaniment to various meat dishes and used as a base for drinks with sugar and water ('agua de guamúchil').

The seeds are said to be eaten (locally?) in the 'Revised handbook to the flora of Ceylon' (1980), edited by M.D. Dassanayake (this information is not in the original 'Flora of Ceylon' of 1894).

A number of studies since the 1980s have investigated the composition and possible uses of the seeds; it has been demonstrated that the seeds can be processed to extract a greenish oil, which when refined and analysed consists of potentially edible fatty acids (the precise composition varies depending on the study, but all agree oleic acid and palmitic acid are common, which is to be expected). Oils amount to 10-17% of the weight of the seeds. The seeds also contain 30-37.5-67.11% protein, which researchers suggest might in the future be used as animal feed.

As traditional medicine 
The bark is used as an astringent for dysentery in India,

It is said to have been used as an antipyretic in India (information originally from 1933), used for eye inflammation, although an anecdote from Sri Lanka claims the bark contains a substance that causes eye infections and swelling of the eyelids.

The Huastec people of northern Veracruz and San Luis Potosí in Mexico used different parts of the tree to treat gum ailments, toothache and cancer.

The leaves are said to be used in a poultice with alcohol to treat bile, as well as being used to prevent abortions/miscarriage, although the leaves are also said to be used to cause abortions.

The pulp from the fruits is said to be astringent and hemostatic, and used for hemoptysis.

The ground seed is sometimes traditionally used to clean ulcers.

Non-specified parts of the plant are said to be used extract is also used against hemorrhages, chronic diarrhea, and tuberculosis.

Ecology 
Pithecellobium dulce is a host plant for the caterpillars of the Common nawab (Polyura athamas), three-spot grass yellow (Eurema blanda), Bright babul blue (Azanus ubaldus) and several moths.

Synonyms 

Pithecellobium dulce is known under numerous junior synonyms:
 Acacia obliquifolia M.Martens & Galeotti
 Albizia dulcis (Roxb.) F.Muell.
 Feuilleea dulcis (Roxb.) Kuntze
 Inga camatchili Perr.
 Inga dulcis (Roxb.) Willd.
 Inga javana DC.
 Inga javanica DC.
 Inga lanceolata sensu Blanco
 Inga lanceolata Willd. is Pithecellobium lanceolatum
 Inga leucantha C.Presl
 Inga pungens Willd.
 Mimosa dulcis Roxb.
 Mimosa edulis Gagnep.
 Mimosa pungens (Willd.) Poir.
 Mimosa unguis-cati Blanco
 Mimosa unguis-cati L. is Pithecellobium unguis-cati
 Pithecellobium littorale Record
 Pithecollobium dulce (Roxb.) Benth. (lapsus)

References

External links 

USDA Plants Profile: Pithecellobium dulce
Kamatsile: Pithecellobium dulce
PIER species: Pithecellobium dulce
Manila Tamarind: Pithecellobium dulce
Mexican Government's Commission for the Knowledge and Use of Biodiversity: Pithecellobium dulce

dulce
Trees of Central America
Trees of South America
Trees of Colombia
Trees of Mexico
Trees of Venezuela
Flora of the Atlantic Forest
Flora of northern South America
Plants described in 1844
Medicinal plants of North America
Edible legumes